Katindra Swargiary is an Indian Boro-language novelist. He is recipient of Sahitya Akademi Award for his novel "Sanmwkhangari Lamajwng" in 2006.

References

Living people
Indian novelists
Year of birth missing (living people)
Recipients of the Sahitya Akademi Award in Bodo
Bodo people